The Braille pattern dots-1245 is a 6-dot or 8-dot braille cell with the top four dots raised. It is represented by the Unicode code point U+281b, and in Braille ASCII with G.

Unified Braille

In unified international braille, the braille pattern dots-1245 is used to represent a voiced velar plosive, i.e. /g/, and is otherwise assigned as needed. It is also used for the number 7.

Table of unified braille values

Other braille

Plus dots 7 and 8

Related to Braille pattern dots-1245 are Braille patterns 12457, 12458, and 124578, which are used in 8-dot braille systems, such as Gardner-Salinas and Luxembourgish Braille.

Related 8-dot kantenji patterns

In the Japanese kantenji braille, the standard 8-dot Braille patterns 2356, 12356, 23456, and 123456 are the patterns related to Braille pattern dots-1245, since the two additional dots of kantenji patterns 01245, 12457, and 012457 are placed above the base 6-dot cell, instead of below, as in standard 8-dot braille.

Kantenji using braille patterns 2356, 12356, 23456, or 123456

This listing includes kantenji using Braille pattern dots-1245 for all 6349 kanji found in JIS C 6226-1978.

  - 口

Variants and thematic compounds

  -  れ/口 + selector 1  =  唖
  -  selector 1 + selector 1 + ぬ/力  =  刄
  -  れ/口 + selector 4  =  味
  -  selector 6 + れ/口  =  鬲
  -  数 + #7  =  七
  -  比 + れ/口  =  凸

Compounds of 口

  -  れ/口 + ろ/十  =  古
  -  ち/竹 + れ/口  =  箇
  -  れ/口 + 氷/氵  =  故
  -  な/亻 + れ/口 + ろ/十  =  估
  -  ふ/女 + れ/口 + ろ/十  =  姑
  -  る/忄 + れ/口 + ろ/十  =  怙
  -  に/氵 + れ/口 + ろ/十  =  沽
  -  す/発 + れ/口 + ろ/十  =  罟
  -  心 + れ/口 + ろ/十  =  葫
  -  む/車 + れ/口 + ろ/十  =  蛄
  -  え/訁 + れ/口 + ろ/十  =  詁
  -  ろ/十 + れ/口 + ろ/十  =  辜
  -  せ/食 + れ/口 + ろ/十  =  醐
  -  か/金 + れ/口 + ろ/十  =  鈷
  -  ろ/十 + れ/口 + 宿  =  兢
  -  れ/口 + 宿 + き/木  =  呆
  -  な/亻 + れ/口  =  保
  -  つ/土 + な/亻 + れ/口  =  堡
  -  く/艹 + な/亻 + れ/口  =  葆
  -  ね/示 + な/亻 + れ/口  =  褓
  -  龸 + な/亻 + れ/口  =  襃
  -  ぬ/力 + れ/口  =  加
  -  れ/口 + selector 4 + ぬ/力  =  叨
  -  仁/亻 + れ/口  =  伽
  -  れ/口 + き/木  =  架
  -  き/木 + ぬ/力 + れ/口  =  枷
  -  へ/⺩ + ぬ/力 + れ/口  =  珈
  -  や/疒 + ぬ/力 + れ/口  =  痂
  -  ち/竹 + ぬ/力 + れ/口  =  笳
  -  心 + ぬ/力 + れ/口  =  茄
  -  ね/示 + ぬ/力 + れ/口  =  袈
  -  み/耳 + ぬ/力 + れ/口  =  跏
  -  ひ/辶 + ぬ/力 + れ/口  =  迦
  -  そ/馬 + ぬ/力 + れ/口  =  駕
  -  す/発 + れ/口  =  各
  -  宿 + れ/口  =  客
  -  れ/口 + 宿 + れ/口  =  喀
  -  き/木 + れ/口  =  格
  -  に/氵 + れ/口  =  洛
  -  く/艹 + れ/口  =  落
  -  み/耳 + れ/口  =  路
  -  心 + み/耳 + れ/口  =  蕗
  -  た/⽥ + れ/口  =  略
  -  た/⽥ + た/⽥ + れ/口  =  畧
  -  い/糹/#2 + れ/口  =  絡
  -  れ/口 + す/発 + れ/口  =  咯
  -  る/忄 + す/発 + れ/口  =  恪
  -  て/扌 + す/発 + れ/口  =  挌
  -  火 + す/発 + れ/口  =  烙
  -  へ/⺩ + す/発 + れ/口  =  珞
  -  く/艹 + す/発 + れ/口  =  茖
  -  け/犬 + す/発 + れ/口  =  貉
  -  を/貝 + す/発 + れ/口  =  賂
  -  む/車 + す/発 + れ/口  =  輅
  -  つ/土 + れ/口  =  吉
  -  ゑ/訁 + れ/口  =  詰
  -  ゐ/幺 + れ/口  =  結
  -  な/亻 + つ/土 + れ/口  =  佶
  -  な/亻 + れ/口 + 氷/氵  =  做
  -  ぬ/力 + つ/土 + れ/口  =  劼
  -  て/扌 + つ/土 + れ/口  =  拮
  -  き/木 + つ/土 + れ/口  =  桔
  -  い/糹/#2 + つ/土 + れ/口  =  纈
  -  ね/示 + つ/土 + れ/口  =  襭
  -  ほ/方 + れ/口  =  名
  -  か/金 + れ/口  =  銘
  -  心 + ほ/方 + れ/口  =  茗
  -  よ/广 + れ/口  =  后
  -  え/訁 + よ/广 + れ/口  =  詬
  -  つ/土 + 宿 + れ/口  =  垢
  -  り/分 + れ/口  =  含
  -  く/艹 + り/分 + れ/口  =  莟
  -  ら/月 + れ/口  =  吾
  -  る/忄 + れ/口  =  悟
  -  れ/口 + ら/月 + れ/口  =  唔
  -  囗 + ら/月 + れ/口  =  圄
  -  う/宀/#3 + ら/月 + れ/口  =  寤
  -  日 + ら/月 + れ/口  =  晤
  -  心 + ら/月 + れ/口  =  梧
  -  そ/馬 + ら/月 + れ/口  =  牾
  -  へ/⺩ + ら/月 + れ/口  =  珸
  -  ゆ/彳 + ら/月 + れ/口  =  衙
  -  し/巿 + れ/口  =  呻
  -  の/禾 + れ/口  =  和
  -  れ/口 + の/禾 + れ/口  =  啝
  -  を/貝 + れ/口  =  員
  -  て/扌 + れ/口  =  損
  -  ま/石 + れ/口  =  韻
  -  ほ/方 + を/貝 + れ/口  =  殞
  -  ろ/十 + れ/口  =  唇
  -  も/門 + れ/口  =  問
  -  と/戸 + れ/口  =  啓
  -  そ/馬 + れ/口  =  善
  -  ⺼ + れ/口  =  膳
  -  火 + れ/口  =  嘘
  -  け/犬 + れ/口  =  器
  -  囗 + れ/口  =  回
  -  は/辶 + れ/口  =  廻
  -  ゆ/彳 + 囗 + れ/口  =  徊
  -  く/艹 + 囗 + れ/口  =  茴
  -  む/車 + 囗 + れ/口  =  蛔
  -  な/亻 + 囗 + れ/口  =  嗇
  -  心 + 囗 + れ/口  =  薔
  -  つ/土 + 囗 + れ/口  =  墻
  -  き/木 + 囗 + れ/口  =  檣
  -  ふ/女 + 囗 + れ/口  =  艢
  -  ね/示 + 囗 + れ/口  =  禀
  -  氷/氵 + 宿 + れ/口  =  凛
  -  の/禾 + 囗 + れ/口  =  稟
  -  よ/广 + 囗 + れ/口  =  廩
  -  る/忄 + 囗 + れ/口  =  懍
  -  て/扌 + 囗 + れ/口  =  擅
  -  ふ/女 + れ/口  =  如
  -  に/氵 + ふ/女 + れ/口  =  洳
  -  い/糹/#2 + ふ/女 + れ/口  =  絮
  -  く/艹 + ふ/女 + れ/口  =  茹
  -  心 + れ/口  =  杏
  -  や/疒 + れ/口  =  知
  -  き/木 + や/疒 + れ/口  =  椥
  -  み/耳 + や/疒 + れ/口  =  聟
  -  む/車 + や/疒 + れ/口  =  蜘
  -  お/頁 + れ/口  =  顎
  -  れ/口 + 宿  =  兄
  -  れ/口 + ね/示  =  別
  -  て/扌 + れ/口 + ね/示  =  捌
  -  れ/口 + と/戸  =  占
  -  れ/口 + 火  =  点
  -  や/疒 + れ/口 + と/戸  =  岾
  -  て/扌 + れ/口 + と/戸  =  拈
  -  に/氵 + れ/口 + と/戸  =  沾
  -  ま/石 + れ/口 + と/戸  =  砧
  -  ち/竹 + れ/口 + と/戸  =  笘
  -  く/艹 + れ/口 + と/戸  =  苫
  -  せ/食 + れ/口 + と/戸  =  鮎
  -  の/禾 + れ/口 + と/戸  =  黏
  -  れ/口 + れ/口 + 火  =  點
  -  れ/口 + め/目 + 宿  =  覘
  -  れ/口 + は/辶  =  只
  -  た/⽥ + れ/口 + は/辶  =  咫
  -  心 + れ/口 + は/辶  =  枳
  -  れ/口 + さ/阝  =  叫
  -  れ/口 + ひ/辶  =  叱
  -  れ/口 + な/亻  =  史
  -  そ/馬 + れ/口 + な/亻  =  駛
  -  れ/口 + す/発  =  号
  -  れ/口 + れ/口 + す/発  =  號
  -  せ/食 + れ/口 + す/発  =  饕
  -  れ/口 + 仁/亻  =  吏
  -  れ/口 + つ/土  =  吐
  -  れ/口 + つ/土 + つ/土  =  哇
  -  れ/口 + り/分  =  吟
  -  れ/口 + ゐ/幺  =  吸
  -  れ/口 + ん/止  =  吹
  -  れ/口 + 数  =  吻
  -  れ/口 + へ/⺩  =  呈
  -  ひ/辶 + れ/口 + へ/⺩  =  逞
  -  さ/阝 + れ/口 + へ/⺩  =  郢
  -  せ/食 + れ/口 + へ/⺩  =  酲
  -  れ/口 + へ/⺩ + と/戸  =  哢
  -  れ/口 + へ/⺩ + を/貝  =  嘖
  -  れ/口 + や/疒  =  呼
  -  れ/口 + け/犬  =  咲
  -  れ/口 + う/宀/#3  =  品
  -  や/疒 + れ/口 + う/宀/#3  =  嵒
  -  る/忄 + れ/口 + う/宀/#3  =  懆
  -  に/氵 + れ/口 + う/宀/#3  =  澡
  -  え/訁 + れ/口 + う/宀/#3  =  譟
  -  れ/口 + そ/馬  =  哨
  -  れ/口 + を/貝  =  哲
  -  れ/口 + ほ/方  =  哺
  -  れ/口 + の/禾  =  唆
  -  れ/口 + い/糹/#2  =  唯
  -  れ/口 + 日  =  唱
  -  れ/口 + る/忄  =  唸
  -  れ/口 + ゑ/訁  =  啜
  -  れ/口 + こ/子  =  喉
  -  れ/口 + よ/广  =  喋
  -  れ/口 + ⺼  =  喚
  -  れ/口 + ゆ/彳  =  喩
  -  れ/口 + め/目  =  嗅
  -  れ/口 + に/氵  =  嗜
  -  れ/口 + く/艹  =  嘆
  -  れ/口 + も/門  =  嘔
  -  れ/口 + み/耳  =  嘱
  -  れ/口 + ふ/女  =  噴
  -  れ/口 + ま/石  =  噺
  -  れ/口 + か/金  =  嚇
  -  れ/口 + 龸  =  囃
  -  れ/口 + し/巿  =  尋
  -  に/氵 + れ/口 + し/巿  =  潯
  -  心 + れ/口 + し/巿  =  蕁
  -  れ/口 + 心  =  患
  -  れ/口 + せ/食  =  舌
  -  れ/口 + ち/竹  =  筈
  -  れ/口 + て/扌  =  括
  -  ぬ/力 + れ/口 + せ/食  =  刮
  -  る/忄 + れ/口 + せ/食  =  恬
  -  み/耳 + れ/口 + せ/食  =  聒
  -  ん/止 + れ/口 + せ/食  =  舐
  -  む/車 + れ/口 + せ/食  =  蛞
  -  か/金 + れ/口 + せ/食  =  銛
  -  も/門 + れ/口 + せ/食  =  闊
  -  れ/口 + 数 + り/分  =  叭
  -  れ/口 + 数 + て/扌  =  叮
  -  れ/口 + 宿 + ろ/十  =  叶
  -  れ/口 + 比 + な/亻  =  叺
  -  れ/口 + selector 1 + か/金  =  吁
  -  れ/口 + 龸 + お/頁  =  吃
  -  れ/口 + 比 + し/巿  =  吋
  -  れ/口 + 龸 + selector 3  =  吝
  -  け/犬 + 宿 + れ/口  =  吠
  -  れ/口 + 宿 + り/分  =  吩
  -  れ/口 + 比 + を/貝  =  听
  -  れ/口 + selector 5 + 宿  =  吭
  -  れ/口 + 宿 + む/車  =  吮
  -  れ/口 + 囗 + 仁/亻  =  吶
  -  れ/口 + こ/子 + を/貝  =  吼
  -  れ/口 + そ/馬 + selector 1  =  吽
  -  れ/口 + selector 4 + め/目  =  呀
  -  れ/口 + 比 + た/⽥  =  呎
  -  れ/口 + 比 + selector 4  =  呰
  -  れ/口 + 心 + つ/土  =  呱
  -  な/亻 + れ/口 + う/宀/#3  =  侃
  -  れ/口 + れ/口 + み/耳  =  囑
  -  き/木 + れ/口 + み/耳  =  楫
  -  れ/口 + ふ/女 + ゑ/訁  =  呶
  -  れ/口 + 数 + こ/子  =  呷
  -  れ/口 + selector 5 + そ/馬  =  咀
  -  れ/口 + 比 + へ/⺩  =  咄
  -  れ/口 + も/門 + selector 2  =  咆
  -  れ/口 + 宿 + さ/阝  =  咋
  -  れ/口 + 宿 + す/発  =  咎
  -  れ/口 + 氷/氵 + selector 4  =  咏
  -  れ/口 + な/亻 + し/巿  =  咐
  -  れ/口 + selector 6 + 龸  =  咒
  -  れ/口 + う/宀/#3 + な/亻  =  咤
  -  れ/口 + selector 4 + ゆ/彳  =  咥
  -  れ/口 + 氷/氵 + ん/止  =  咨
  -  れ/口 + 龸 + ち/竹  =  咬
  -  れ/口 + 宿 + ゐ/幺  =  咳
  -  れ/口 + 囗 + け/犬  =  咽
  -  れ/口 + と/戸 + selector 2  =  咾
  -  れ/口 + 比 + に/氵  =  哂
  -  れ/口 + selector 4 + こ/子  =  哄
  -  れ/口 + り/分 + 囗  =  哈
  -  れ/口 + 宿 + ゆ/彳  =  哘
  -  れ/口 + 囗 + selector 1  =  哦
  -  れ/口 + 比 + り/分  =  哩
  -  れ/口 + 宿 + け/犬  =  哭
  -  れ/口 + と/戸 + こ/子  =  哮
  -  れ/口 + 日 + な/亻  =  哽
  -  れ/口 + 宿 + ん/止  =  唄
  -  れ/口 + め/目 + し/巿  =  唏
  -  れ/口 + 宿 + い/糹/#2  =  售
  -  れ/口 + と/戸 + け/犬  =  唳
  -  れ/口 + ほ/方 + 龸  =  唹
  -  れ/口 + 宿 + に/氵  =  唾
  -  れ/口 + 宿 + つ/土  =  啀
  -  れ/口 + そ/馬 + selector 3  =  啄
  -  れ/口 + 日 + と/戸  =  啅
  -  れ/口 + う/宀/#3 + き/木  =  啌
  -  れ/口 + 火 + 火  =  啖
  -  れ/口 + 宿 + ぬ/力  =  啗
  -  れ/口 + ん/止 + さ/阝  =  啣
  -  れ/口 + ま/石 + し/巿  =  啼
  -  れ/口 + の/禾 + 火  =  啾
  -  れ/口 + 比 + み/耳  =  喃
  -  れ/口 + き/木 + ぬ/力  =  喇
  -  れ/口 + ひ/辶 + selector 3  =  喊
  -  れ/口 + 宿 + の/禾  =  喘
  -  れ/口 + 龸 + そ/馬  =  喙
  -  れ/口 + 宿 + 氷/氵  =  喝
  -  れ/口 + す/発 + さ/阝  =  喞
  -  れ/口 + た/⽥ + ⺼  =  喟
  -  れ/口 + う/宀/#3 + 日  =  喧
  -  れ/口 + う/宀/#3 + 囗  =  喨
  -  れ/口 + せ/食 + せ/食  =  喰
  -  れ/口 + お/頁 + す/発  =  嗄
  -  れ/口 + selector 1 + め/目  =  嗔
  -  れ/口 + せ/食 + う/宀/#3  =  嗚
  -  れ/口 + そ/馬 + こ/子  =  嗟
  -  れ/口 + む/車 + selector 1  =  嗤
  -  れ/口 + 宿 + ほ/方  =  嗷
  -  れ/口 + ひ/辶 + む/車  =  嗹
  -  れ/口 + ほ/方 + や/疒  =  嗾
  -  れ/口 + 心 + ま/石  =  嘛
  -  れ/口 + く/艹 + か/金  =  嘩
  -  れ/口 + ぬ/力 + ゆ/彳  =  嘯
  -  れ/口 + 囗 + selector 6  =  嘴
  -  れ/口 + 宿 + を/貝  =  嘶
  -  れ/口 + む/車 + 火  =  嘸
  -  れ/口 + 宿 + そ/馬  =  噌
  -  れ/口 + る/忄 + selector 1  =  噎
  -  け/犬 + け/犬 + れ/口  =  噐
  -  れ/口 + ん/止 + の/禾  =  噛
  -  れ/口 + き/木 + ね/示  =  噤
  -  れ/口 + 宿 + う/宀/#3  =  噪
  -  れ/口 + selector 1 + な/亻  =  噫
  -  れ/口 + 仁/亻 + ふ/女  =  噬
  -  れ/口 + お/頁 + ふ/女  =  噸
  -  れ/口 + 宿 + て/扌  =  嚀
  -  れ/口 + 比 + え/訁  =  嚆
  -  れ/口 + め/目 + た/⽥  =  嚊
  -  れ/口 + 宿 + め/目  =  嚏
  -  れ/口 + う/宀/#3 + め/目  =  嚔
  -  れ/口 + 宿 + か/金  =  嚠
  -  れ/口 + 宿 + せ/食  =  嚥
  -  れ/口 + ふ/女 + を/貝  =  嚶
  -  れ/口 + 龸 + や/疒  =  嚼
  -  れ/口 + む/車 + て/扌  =  囀
  -  れ/口 + 宿 + お/頁  =  囂
  -  れ/口 + く/艹 + え/訁  =  囈
  -  れ/口 + を/貝 + そ/馬  =  囎
  -  ま/石 + ぬ/力 + 囗  =  韶
  -  さ/阝 + ぬ/力 + 囗  =  邵
  -  れ/口 + 宿 + ぬ/力  =  啗
  -  て/扌 + 宿 + れ/口  =  揖
  -  火 + 囗 + れ/口  =  烱
  -  い/糹/#2 + 囗 + れ/口  =  絅
  -  む/車 + 宿 + れ/口  =  轡

Compounds of 鬲

  -  さ/阝 + れ/口  =  隔
  -  れ/口 + む/車  =  融
  -  龸 + れ/口  =  京
  -  日 + れ/口  =  景
  -  る/忄 + 日 + れ/口  =  憬
  -  氷/氵 + れ/口  =  涼
  -  氷/氵 + 氷/氵 + れ/口  =  凉
  -  せ/食 + れ/口  =  鯨
  -  え/訁 + れ/口  =  諒
  -  selector 1 + 龸 + れ/口  =  亰
  -  ぬ/力 + 龸 + れ/口  =  勍
  -  て/扌 + 龸 + れ/口  =  掠
  -  心 + 龸 + れ/口  =  椋

Compounds of 七

  -  れ/口 + ぬ/力  =  切
  -  う/宀/#3 + れ/口  =  窃
  -  ま/石 + れ/口 + ぬ/力  =  砌

Other compounds

  -  れ/口 + れ/口  =  単
  -  れ/口 + れ/口 + れ/口  =  單
  -  ふ/女 + れ/口 + れ/口  =  嬋
  -  れ/口 + れ/口 + 囗  =  戰
  -  ね/示 + れ/口 + れ/口  =  襌
  -  さ/阝 + れ/口 + れ/口  =  鄲
  -  も/門 + れ/口 + れ/口  =  闡
  -  る/忄 + れ/口 + れ/口  =  憚
  -  ほ/方 + れ/口 + れ/口  =  殫
  -  ゆ/彳 + れ/口  =  弾
  -  ゆ/彳 + ゆ/彳 + れ/口  =  彈
  -  ね/示 + れ/口  =  禅
  -  ね/示 + ね/示 + れ/口  =  禪
  -  む/車 + れ/口  =  蝉
  -  れ/口 + 囗  =  戦
  -  ち/竹 + れ/口 + れ/口  =  箪
  -  そ/馬 + れ/口 + れ/口  =  騨
  -  ね/示 + 宿 + れ/口  =  褝
  -  い/糹/#2 + と/戸 + れ/口  =  綮
  -  ふ/女 + と/戸 + れ/口  =  肇
  -  れ/口 + 宿 + 囗  =  串
  -  囗 + 囗 + れ/口  =  囘
  -  心 + 宿 + れ/口  =  梔
  -  う/宀/#3 + う/宀/#3 + れ/口  =  竊
  -  そ/馬 + そ/馬 + れ/口  =  譱
  -  か/金 + ぬ/力 + そ/馬  =  鋤
  -  り/分 + れ/口 + れ/口  =  龠

Notes

Braille patterns